Kreegah bundolo is a phrase that Tarzan—and the tribe of apes that raised him—cry out to warn of danger, for example, "Kreegah bundolo!  White men come with hunt sticks.  Kill!" According to the fictional ape language worked out by Tarzan creator Edgar Rice Burroughs, the literal translation of the phrase would be "Beware, (I) kill!"

"Kreegah Bundola" is one of a few names for the Frank Zappa song whose most popular title seems to be "Let's Move to Cleveland". It is also utilized in Bruce Coville's "Allbright" series as Grakker's "violence" module boot-up sound byte (from Aliens Ate My Homework). It was uttered by a hunger-crazed Fat Freddy in an episode of The Fabulous Furry Freak Brothers.

In Portuguese, "Kreegah bundolo" was translated as "Krig-Ha, Bandolo!", and used as the name of an album by the Brazilian rocker Raul Seixas.

In the comic strip Dilbert dated February 7, 1995, Dogbert uses this phrase in speaking with Dilbert after he has been home telecommuting too long.

In Mexican comic "El Santos Contra la Tetona Mendoza by cartoonists Jis y Trino, el Santos uses the " mexican-ized" expression "Kriga Bundolo" when furious or flexing muscles.

See also
Great ape language

References

Tarzan
Fictional languages